Grega Žemlja was the defending champion but chose not to compete.

Blaž Kavčič won the tournament, beating Gilles Müller 7–5, 6–7(4–7), 6–1

Seeds

  Blaž Kavčič (champion)
  Gilles Müller (final)
  Evgeny Donskoy (semifinals)
  Adrián Menéndez-Maceiras (first round)
  Thomas Fabbiano (quarterfinals)
  David Guez (second round)
  Flavio Cipolla (first round)
  Ilija Bozoljac (second round)

Draw

Finals

Top half

Bottom half

References
 Main Draw
 Qualifying Draw

Tilia Slovenia Open - Singles
2014 Singles